Cryptogramophone Records is a jazz record label  formed in 1998 by violinist Jeff Gauthier to document the music of his friend, Eric von Essen.

Cryptogramophone has released albums by such West Coast musicians as guitarist Nels Cline, drummer Alex Cline, bassists Darek Oles and Steuart Liebig, drummer Scott Amendola, guitarist G. E. Stinson, trombonist Scot Ray, pianist Don Preston and Gauthier himself. In addition, Cryptogramophone has recorded New York City musicians Mark Dresser and Erik Friedlander.

Discography

See also 
 List of record labels

External links 
 Official Cryptogramophone site
 Cryptonight
 IndieJazz.com

American record labels
Jazz record labels
Record labels established in 1998